Ratty may refer to:

 Ratty (railway), a heritage railway in Cumbria, England
 Ratty, a character in the novel The Wind in the Willows by Kenneth Grahame
 Ratty, a pseudonym of some members of Scooter, best known for the single "Sunrise (Here I Am)"
 Ratty, a Disney character from the Donald Duck universe
 Ratty (film), a 1986 Swedish animated feature film

See also
 Rati (given name)
 Raty